is one of Japan's three largest limestone caverns. It is located in the town of Iwaizumi, Iwate Prefecture, in the Tōhoku region of northern Japan.

Overview 
The total confirmed length of the cave is currently , although the cave may extend much further. Further exploration has been banned following a fatality in December 1968. The cave system is also home to colonies of Greater horseshoe bat, Eastern long-fingered bat, Brown long-eared bat and Hilgendorf's tube-nosed bat as well as Microbats.

Ryūsendō was designed a Natural monument by the Japanese government in 1934. The caves were opened to the public in 1967. Its underground lake system was designated one of the “100 Famous Springs of Japan” in 1985 by the Ministry of the Environment.

Shin-Ryūsendō 
The adjacent Shin-Ryūsendō (龍泉新洞, "New Ryūsendō") caves nearby were discovered in 1967. It claims to be the “first natural cave science museum in the world”, and contains displays of earthenware and stoneware discovered in 1967, together with displays on the geology of the main Ryūsendō caverns.

Gallery

References

External links

A Trip to Iwate
Japan Travel Guide
Morioka-Hachimantai Tourist Advisor

Show caves in Japan
Landforms of Iwate Prefecture
Tourist attractions in Iwate Prefecture
Iwaizumi, Iwate